Carlos Guevara (born 3 April 1930, date of death unknown) was a Mexican football midfielder who played for Mexico in the 1950 FIFA World Cup. He also played for Asturias.

Guevara is deceased.

References

External links
FIFA profile

1930 births
Year of death missing
Mexico international footballers
Association football midfielders
Asturias F.C. players
1950 FIFA World Cup players
Footballers from Puebla
Mexican footballers